Scarborough—Agincourt is a federal electoral district in Toronto, Ontario, Canada that has been represented in the House of Commons of Canada since 1988. It covers the area of the City of Toronto bounded by  Steeles Avenue East to the north, Highway 401 to the south, Victoria Park Avenue to the west, and Midland Avenue to the east.

Geography
The riding covers the northwest of the Scarborough part of Toronto. It contains the neighbourhoods of Steeles, L'Amoreaux, Tam O'Shanter-Sullivan, Agincourt (west of Midland Avenue) and Milliken (west of Midland Avenue).

Former boundaries

Demographics
Immigrants make up 67.8% of the population of Scarborough—Agincourt, the highest such percentage for any Canadian federal riding; those from Asia and the Middle East alone, constitute a majority of the population (53.0%), which is also the highest figure for any federal riding, and, in particular, immigrants from the People's Republic of China are almost a quarter (24.7%) of the riding's population, another Canadian high. Chinese, not otherwise specified (i.e. Cantonese, Mandarin, etc.) is the home language for 12.0% of the people in Scarborough—Agincourt (another demographic record).

According to the Canada 2021 Census

Ethnic groups: 42.9% Chinese, 17.2% White, 15.0% South Asian, 7.2% Black, 6.3% Filipino, 2.1% Arab, 1.9% West Asian, 1.3% Southeast Asian, 1.1% Latin American
Languages: 30.2% English, 17.1% Cantonese, 17.0% Mandarin, 3.6% Tamil, 3.1% Tagalog, 2.6% Armenian, 2.0% Arabic, 1.3% Greek, 1.3% Urdu 
Religions: 41.2% Christian (16.8% Catholic, 5.0% Christian Orthodox, 1.6% Anglican, 1.3% Pentecostal, 1.2% Baptist, 15.3% Other), 7.8% Hindu, 7.6% Muslim, 4.7% Buddhist, 37.5% None
Median income: $31,400 (2020)
Average income: $41,560 (2020)

History
The federal riding was created in 1987 from York—Scarborough. It consisted in initially of the part of the City of Scarborough bounded on the west by Victoria Park Avenue, on the north by Steeles Avenue East, on the east by the Canadian National Railway line situated immediately west of Midland Avenue, and on the south by Ellesmere Road.

In 2003, it was given the boundaries as described above.

A by-election was held on June 30, 2014 as a result of the resignation of Member of Parliament Jim Karygiannis to run for City Councillor in the 2014 Toronto municipal election.

Following the 2012 federal electoral boundaries redistribution, the riding lost the part of the riding east of Midland Avenue to the new riding of Scarborough North.

Following the death of Member of Parliament Arnold Chan on September 14, 2017, his widow, Jean Yip, won the seat.

Members of Parliament
This riding has elected the following members of the House of Commons of Canada:

Election results

On November 5, 2017, Prime Minister Justin Trudeau announced that a by-election would be held on December 11, 2017.

Neighbourhoods

Three neighbourhoods fall completely within the borders of Scarborough—Agincourt:
 #116 - Steeles
 #117 - L'Amoreaux
 #118 - Tam O'Shanter-Sullivan

The west ends of three neighbourhoods also fall within the borders of Scarborough—Agincourt:
 #128 - Agincourt South-Malvern West
 #129 - Agincourt North
 #130 - Milliken

In addition, there are other neighbourhoods such as Wishing Well, Lynngate and Bridlewood.

Community and resident associations
 ACSA: Agincourt Community Services Association
 Bridlewood
 Leacock Community Association
 Lynngate Residents' Association & Neighbourhood Watch
 Neighbourhood Watch
 SAS Scarborough Association of Seniors
 The Scarborough-Agincourt Ward 40 Residents' Association

See also
 List of Canadian federal electoral districts
 Past Canadian electoral districts

References

Riding history from Library of Parliament
 2011 results from Elections Canada
 Campaign expense data from Elections Canada

Notes

Federal electoral districts of Toronto
Ontario federal electoral districts
Scarborough, Toronto
1987 establishments in Ontario